Barton is a census-designated place and unincorporated community in Pierce County, North Dakota, United States. Its population was 20 as of the 2010 census.

History
Barton was founded in 1887 at a junction on the Great Northern Railway. The town was originally named Denney. The town was renamed to Barton on June 13, 1893 by as Postmaster James A. Tyvand. Barton was incorporated in 1906, and the town reached the peak population of 202 in 1910. Barton declined to a population of 38 in 1980. Barton disincorporated in 1997.

Geography
Barton is located at  (48.506944, −100.176111).

Demographics

2010 census
As of the census of 2010, there were 20 people, 7 households, and 5 families residing in the CDP. The racial makeup of the CDP was 100.0% White.

There were 7 households, of which 57.1% had children under the age of 18 living with them, 71.4% were married couples living together, and 28.6% were non-families. 14.3% of all households were made up of individuals, and 14.3% had someone living alone who was 65 years of age or older. The average household size was 2.86 and the average family size was 3.40.

The median age in the CDP was 45.5 years. 35.0% of residents were under the age of 18; 5.0% were between the ages of 18 and 24; 5.0% were from 25 to 44; 40.0% were from 45 to 64; and 15.0% were 65 years of age or older. The gender makeup of the CDP was 65.0% male and 35.0% female.

Education
It is within Rugby Public Schools, which operates Rugby High School.

References

Census-designated places in Pierce County, North Dakota
Census-designated places in North Dakota
Former municipalities in North Dakota
Unincorporated communities in North Dakota
Unincorporated communities in Pierce County, North Dakota
Railway towns in North Dakota
Populated places disestablished in 1997
1997 disestablishments in North Dakota
Populated places established in 1887
1887 establishments in Dakota Territory